Vimont station is a commuter rail station operated by Exo in Laval, Quebec, Canada. It is served by  the Saint-Jérôme line.

The station is in ARTM fare zone B, and currently has 200 parking spaces. Prior to the reform of the ARTM's fare structure in July 2022, it was in zone 3.

History

CP Service
There was previously a Canadian Pacific Railway station called "Petite-Cote" at this location.

AMT Service
The station was opened on October 18, 2006, by the former Agence Métropolitaine de Transport (AMT) following growing demand for service following the collapse of the De la Concorde overpass in Laval. The station has since become a permanent stop on the line. Between 2011 and 2013, the double track was extended north through the station, requiring the construction of a second side platform.

RTM service

On June 1, 2017, the AMT was dissolved and replaced by two new governing bodies, the Autorité régionale de transport métropolitain (ARTM) and the Réseau de transport métropolitain (RTM). The RTM took over all former AMT services, including service at this station.

Connecting bus routes

Société de transport de Laval

Future plans
The station will be made permanent once the City of Laval completes the extension of boulevard Dagenais between boulevard des Laurentides and boulevard Industriel. The new station calls for 300 permanent parking spaces, kiss and ride spaces, and a bus loop. After completion of the first phase, the ARTM will evaluate the long-term needs of the station, which could call for up to 600 parking spaces, and plan for the second phase, if required.

References

External links
 Official RTM website (In French)
 Vimont Commuter Train Station Schedule (RTM)
 Interactive STL map
 STL 2011 map

Exo commuter rail stations
Railway stations in Canada opened in 2006
Railway stations in Laval, Quebec
2006 establishments in Quebec